Dino Baia Adriano (24 April 1943 – 9 May 2018) was a British businessman, and a former chief executive of Sainsbury's, as well as being directors of Homebase, Shaws and a trustee of Oxfam. He was noted in financial circles for trying to turn round the fortunes of Sainsbury's after they lost their number one spot to Tesco's.

Early life
Born in London in 1943, of Italian descent, he was educated in Highgate College. He attended Strand School, a boys' grammar school in Central London.

Career

Sainsbury's
Adriano worked at Sainsbury's for 36 years. He joined Sainsbury's in 1964 and worked his way up through the ranks, including moving over their DIY company, Homebase, and to their Shaws subsidiary in 1992 In 1996 he became deputy chief executive of Sainsbury's. In 1997 he became chairman and chief executive of Sainsbury's.  He was the first chief executive of the company that was not one of the Sainsbury's family, in a company that still had the family as 40% shareholders He left in January 2000.

Homebase
He was selected by Gurth Millar Hoyer to become managing director of Homebase in 1989.

Back to the Floor appearance
In 1999, Adriano agreed to be on the BBC2 television programme Back to the Floor, in which he, as managing director of leading retail companies, went back to the shop floor and worked there for a while with the cameras on him. In the series three episode "Supermarket swap", broadcast on 28 October 1999, Adriano was seen doing the routine things a shop worker had to do; he answered a question from an employee about his six-figure salary, but perhaps his most famous moment was when he decided that because he couldn't be bothered to wait for a price for a product while he worked on the busy checkouts; he just gave the item to the customer.

Personal life
He was married and had two daughters, one of whom worked in Sainsbury's.
He died, aged 75, in May 2018. He lived in Surrey.

References

External links
 IMDb

1943 births
2018 deaths
British people of Italian descent
British retail chief executives
People educated at the Strand School
Sainsbury's people
Businesspeople from London
20th-century English businesspeople